A fluid is a substance that continually deforms (flows) under an applied shear stress. 

Fluid may also refer to:

Arts, entertainment and media
"Fluid" (Lil' Fizz song), 2006
Fluid (video game), a game for the Sony PlayStation
The Fluid, an American rock band

Computing
Fluid (web browser), a WebKit-based site-specific browser for Mac OS X
Fluid Framework, computer platform for real-time collaboration across applications by Microsoft
FLUID, a user interface design program

See also